Fair Maid may refer to:
 Eleanor, Fair Maid of Brittany (1184–1241),
 Margaret, Maid of Norway (1283–1290), the Fair Maid of Norway
 Joan of Kent (1328–1385), the Fair Maid of Kent
 Margaret Douglas, Fair Maid of Galloway (died 1474)
 The Fair Maid of the Inn, a comedy in the canon of John Fletcher
 The Fair Maid of Perth, a novel by Sir Walter Scott
 The Fair Maid of the West, a play written by Thomas Heywood